The 78th Clifford Cup tournament was held between the 28 September and 7 October 2012.

The cup final was held on the same day, 7 October 2012, as the final of the 2012 T20 World Cup (which was played at R. Premadasa Stadium in Colombo, between Sri Lanka and West Indies), this resulted in lower crowds than normally experienced at previous Clifford Cup finals. The game was played at Bogambara Stadium instead of Nittawela Rugby Stadium. Havelock SC came into the final after securing the 2012 Rugby League title, having edged out Kandy SC. Kandy SC were the current cup holders, having had won the cup for the previous five years, while Havelock SC's last win was 31 years earlier, in 1981. Kandy SC applied constant pressure during the first half, with a momentary lapse allowing Havelock SC to score before half time, resulting in a 7-5 scoreline. After the break both sides fought hard with only Kandy SC making a dent on the scoreboard eventually winning the game, 10 points (1 converted try and one penalty) to 5 (one unconverted try).

Seedings
The seeding is based upon the teams standings at the end of the 2012 Dialog Rugby League season. The first four seeds represent the four teams in the cup section of the league and the remaining four seeds are the first four teams in the plate section of the league.

 Havelock SC
 Kandy SC
 Navy
 Up Country Lions
 Army SC
 Police SC
 Ceylonese R & FC
 Air Force SC

Quarter finals

Semi finals

Final

References

2012
2012 rugby union tournaments for clubs
2012 in Asian rugby union
2012 in Sri Lankan sport